Show Business is My Life is a solo album by Dr. Frank, singer/songwriter for The Mr. T Experience, released in 1999. Deviating from his band's punk sound, the album incorporates folk and acoustic elements.

The cover shows Dr. Frank playing guitar against a red background.

Track listing
"She Turned Out to be Crazy"
"I Made You and I Can Break You"
"Knock Knock (Please Let Me In)"
"Suicide Watch"
"Bitter Homes & Gardens"
"She All Right"
"Ask Beth"
"Population: Us"
"Thinking of You"
"I'm in Love With What's-Her-Name"
"Two Martinis From Now"
"Sad, Sad Shadow"
"This Isn't About You Anymore"

References

1999 albums